The 1966 Louisville Cardinals football team was an American football team that represented the University of Louisville in the Missouri Valley Conference (MVC) during the 1966 NCAA University Division football season. In their 21st season under head coach Frank Camp, the Cardinals compiled a 6–4 record (1–3 against conference opponents) and outscored opponents by a total of 231 to 159.

The team's statistical leaders included Benny Russell with 2,016 passing yards, Jim Stallings with 350 rushing yards, Jim Zamberlan with 747 receiving yards, and Mike Dennis with 30 points scored.

Schedule

References

Louisville
Louisville Cardinals football seasons
Louisville Cardinals football